Hunters Creek Village is a city in Harris County, Texas, United States, part of the  metropolitan area. The population was 4,385 at the 2020 census. It is part of a collection of upscale residential communities in west Houston known as the Memorial Villages.

As of 2000, Hunters Creek Village was the 5th wealthiest location in Texas by per capita income. A 2010 BusinessWeek study stated that Hunters Creek Village was the most expensive suburb in Texas.

History

Prior to the incorporation of Hunters Creek Village, German and a family of immigrant French-Canadian farmers settled the area and opened sawmills. By 1936 the community had a sawmill, several residences, and a traditional French-Canadian eatery that remains to this day.

In the mid-1950s, effort to form a Spring Branch municipality failed. The city incorporated in 1954 with a mayor-alderman government. Because of the 1954 incorporation, Houston did not incorporate Hunters Creek Village's territory into its city limits, while Houston annexed surrounding areas that were unincorporated. By 1966 year the community had a school and a church. Between 1960 and 1980 the population increased from 2,478 to 4,580. In 1982 the population fell to 4,215. 4,598 people lived in Hunters Creek Village in 1990.

In 2008, Forbes.com selected Hunters Creek Village, along with the adjacent community of Bunker Hill Village and (southwest suburban) Sugar Land, as one of the three Houston-area "Top Suburbs To Live Well."

Geography

Hunters Creek Village is located at  (29.769632, –95.500190).

Demographics

As of the 2020 United States census, there were 4,385 people, 1,657 households, and 1,466 families residing in the city.

As of the census of 2000, there were 4,374 people, 1,471 households, and 1,291 families residing in the city. The population density was 2,253.0 people per square mile (870.5/km2). There were 1,523 housing units at an average density of 784.5/sq mi (303.1/km2). The racial makeup of the city was 93.37% White, 0.37% African American, 0.14% Native American, 4.80% Asian, 0.46% from other races, and 0.87% from two or more races. Hispanic or Latino of any race were 3.59% of the population.

There were 1,471 households, out of which 43.6% had children under the age of 18 living with them, 82.9% were married couples living together, 3.9% had a female householder with no husband present, and 12.2% were non-families. 11.1% of all households were made up of individuals, and 7.7% had someone living alone who was 65 years of age or older. The average household size was 2.97 and the average family size was 3.19.

In the city, the population was spread out, with 31.2% under the age of 18, 3.3% from 18 to 24, 19.6% from 25 to 44, 29.9% from 45 to 64, and 15.9% who were 65 years of age or older. The median age was 43 years. For every 100 females, there were 92.8 males. For every 100 females age 18 and over, there were 89.4 males.

The median income for a household in the city was $171,294, and the median income for a family was $184,574. Males had a median income of $100,000 versus $48,750 for females. The per capita income for the city was $88,821. About 0.6% of families and 1.2% of the population were below the poverty line, including none of those under age 18 and 1.2% of those age 65 or over.

Government and infrastructure

Bunker Hill Village, Hunters Creek Village, and Piney Point Village  jointly operate the Memorial Villages Police Department. The Village Fire Department serves all of the Memorial villages . The village is within the Memorial Villages Water Authority.

Harris County Precinct Three, headed by Steve Radack as of 2008, serves Hunters Creek Village.

Hunters Creek Village is located in District 136 of the Texas House of Representatives. As of 2008 Beverly Woolley represents the district. Hunters Creek Village is within District 7 of the Texas Senate; as of 2008 Dan Patrick represents the district.

Hunters Creek Village was in Texas's 7th congressional district; in 2008, the pro-Republican Party publication Human Events identified the zip code 77024 as the zip code that gave the eighth largest contribution to John McCain's 2008 U.S. Presidential Election campaign. The zip code, which includes the portion of Hunters Creek Village north of the Buffalo Bayou, gave $540,309 United States dollars by October 24, 2008. As of 2019, however, the 7th congressional district is represented by a Democrat, Lizzie Pannill Fletcher.

The current mayor of Hunters Creek Village is Jim Pappas as of May 2017.

Harris Health System (formerly Harris County Hospital District) designated Northwest Health Center for ZIP code 77024 and Valbona Health Center (formerly People's Health Center) in Greater Sharpstown for 77063. The nearest public hospital is Ben Taub General Hospital in the Texas Medical Center.

Education

Primary and secondary schools

Public schools

Hunters Creek Village is located within two school districts, the Spring Branch Independent School District and the Houston Independent School District.

Spring Branch Independent School District 

Most of Hunters Creek Village is north of the Buffalo Bayou; that portion is served by the Spring Branch Independent School District.

All residents are assigned to Wildcat Way School in Houston for preschool.

One school, Hunters Creek Elementary School, is within the city boundaries. Most residents are zoned to Hunters Creek; some are zoned to Memorial Drive Elementary School in Piney Point Village. In 1954 the current Hunters Creek school opened. The district will open a new school building in August 2021.

Students in Hunters Creek go to Spring Branch Middle School and Memorial High School, which are in Hedwig Village.

Houston Independent School District 

The portion south of the Buffalo Bayou is served by the Houston Independent School District.

HISD students are zoned to Briargrove Elementary School, Tanglewood Middle School (formerly Grady Middle School), and Margaret Long Wisdom High School (formerly Robert E. Lee High School) (students may attend Lamar High School or Westside High School instead). Residents of the Briargrove Elementary School attendance zone may apply for the Briarmeadow Charter School. Mark White Elementary School are scheduled to open in August 2016. Residents of the Briargrove Elementary zone, along with those of the Pilgrim, Piney Point, and Emerson zones, will be allowed to apply to this school.

When Westside opened in 2000, residents of the Lee attendance boundary gained the option to attend Westside instead of Lee, with taxpayer subsidized transportation provided.

Private schools
Trinity Classical School has its middle school in the Memorial Middle Campus in the Chinese Baptist Church in Hunters Creek Village

Colleges and universities 

Both Spring Branch ISD and Houston ISD (and therefore the whole city of Hunters Creek Village) are served by the Houston Community College System. The Northwest College operates the nearby Spring Branch Campus in Houston.

Public libraries 

It is served by the Spring Branch Memorial Branch of Harris County Public Library (the Spring Branch Memorial Branch is in Hedwig Village).

Media

The Houston Chronicle is the area regional newspaper.

The Memorial Examiner is a local newspaper distributed in the community .

Postal services

Most of Hunters Creek Village is within the 77024 ZIP code, while the section south of the Buffalo Bayou has the 77063 ZIP code.

The United States Postal Service location serving 77024 is the Memorial Park Post Office at 10505 Town and Country Way, Houston, Texas, 77024-9998.

The location serving 77063 is the John Dunlop Post Office at 8728 Beverlyhill Street, Houston, Texas, 77063-9998.

Gallery

See also

References

External links
 City of Hunters Creek Village official website
 

Cities in Texas
Cities in Harris County, Texas
Greater Houston